The Suffolk County Courthouse, now formally the John Adams Courthouse, is a historic courthouse building in Pemberton Square in Boston, Massachusetts.  It is home to the Massachusetts Supreme Judicial Court (the state's highest court) and the Massachusetts Appeals Court.  Built in 1893, it was the major work of Boston's first city architect, George Clough, and is one of the city's few surviving late 19th-century monumental civic buildings.  It was added to the National Register of Historic Places in 1974.

Description
The John Adams Courthouse is located on the west side of Pemberton Square, now little more than an open plaza bounded by the courthouse on the west, and the backside of the curved Center Plaza building, which faces Tremont Street opposite the Boston City Hall plaza.  The courthouse is a six-story granite structure, fifteen bays wide, with an eclectic stylistic composition. Its first 1-1/2 floor function by appearance as an elevated basement, with small arched windows close to the ground, above which are larger rectangular windows divided in the upper third by a stone stringcourse. Above this basement level is an arcaded mezzanine of large round-arch openings in which paired sash windows are topped by a half-round transom. A dentillated cornice separates this level from a narrower band of three-part windows, above which is a two-level mansard roof pierced by a variety of dormers.  There are projecting pavilions at the ends of the main facade, rising to the top of the mezzanine level on the sides, and the full roof height on the front.

History
The courthouse was built in 1893 to a design by Boston city architect George Clough.  Stylistically the building was described at the time as "German Renaissance"; it is now viewed as transitional between the monumental Second Empire style of Boston's Old City Hall and the Classical Revival.  Of the many buildings Clough designed for the city, this is his largest and most elaborate design.  Clough also designed the 1909 enlargement of the structure, which added the French Chateau-style roof.

From 1893 to 1938, the Supreme Judicial Court and the Social Law Library occupied the building, known then as the Suffolk County Courthouse.  In 2002, the Supreme Judicial Court, the Massachusetts Appeals Court, and the Social Law Library returned to the restored building, which was renamed the John Adams Courthouse.

Gallery

See also
National Register of Historic Places listings in northern Boston, Massachusetts
 List of courthouses in Boston

References

External links

Virtual tour of the John Adams Courthouse from the Massachusetts Judiciary
History of the John Adams Courthouse // © 2021 Commonwealth of Massachusetts.

County courthouses in Massachusetts
Courthouses in Boston
Courthouses on the National Register of Historic Places in Massachusetts
George A. Clough buildings
Government Center, Boston
National Register of Historic Places in Boston